Uncial 0143 (in the Gregory-Aland numbering), ε 08 (Soden), is a Greek uncial manuscript of the New Testament, dated paleographically to the 6th century.

Description 
The codex contains a small part of Gospel of Mark 8:17-18,27-28 on one parchment leaf (14.5 cm by 6 cm). The text is written in two columns per page, 24 lines per page, in small uncial letters.

The Greek text of this codex is a representative of the mixed text-types. Aland placed it in Category III.

Currently it is dated by the INTF to the 6th century.

It is currently housed at the Bodleian Library, Gr. bibl. E, 5 (P) in Oxford.

See also 

 List of New Testament uncials
 Textual criticism

References

Further reading 

 V. Reichmann, Ein Unzialfragment in Oxford. In: Barbara Ehlers, Kurt Aland. Materialien Zur Neutestamentlichen Handschriftenkunde. Arbeiten zur neutestamentliche Textforschung III (ANTF 3) (Berlin, New York 1969), pp. 193–198.

Greek New Testament uncials
6th-century biblical manuscripts
Bodleian Library collection